John Percy Moore (1869–1965) was an American zoologist specialising in leeches.  He was born at Williamsport, Pa. and was educated at the Central High School of Philadelphia (A.B., 1886) and at the University of Pennsylvania B.S., 1892; Ph.D., 1896), where he was instructor in zoology from 1892 to 1907, assistant professor in 1907-09, and thereafter professor.  In 1902 he became assistant curator of the Academy of Natural Sciences at Philadelphia.  After 1890 he was repeatedly employed by the United States Fish Commission, served as instructor in biology at the Hahnemann Medical College in 1896-98, and was instructor in zoology at the Marine Biological Laboratory at Woods Hole, Mass., after 1901.

In 1939 he became Emeritus Professor. Moore was also a member of the Board of Trustees from 1938 to 1957. In 1957 he was made an Honorary Life Trustee of the Academy.

During his years of scientific activity (1893-1963), wrote over 100 papers, 62 of which were about leeches.

Moore's primary zoological interest was the study of leeches and their biological control. He conducted field research in India during 1930-1931 to study the life history of Indian land leeches. His association with the United States National Museum (USNM) began in the early 1900s when he started identifying specimens in the Museum's leech collection. In recognition of his work he was appointed Honorary Collaborator in the Division of Marine Invertebrates, USNM, in 1930. On his death in 1965, Moore's collection of leeches was donated to the USNM.

Species described

The following species were first described by J.P. Moore (also abbreviated J. Percy Moore):
Phytobdella catenifera
Haemadipsa interrupta
Diplocardia longa

Taxon named in his honor 
 Pseudochromis moorei the Jaguar dottyback,was named in his honor.

References 

University of Pennsylvania faculty
People from Williamsport, Pennsylvania
American zoologists
1869 births
1965 deaths
United States Fish Commission personnel